Nobody Knows is a song by the English singer-songwriter Nik Kershaw. It was released as the lead single from his third studio album Radio Musicola (1986). The release was Kershaw's tenth single, and features the non-album track, "One of Our Fruit Machines Is Missing" as its B-side.

Background
The single only reached #44 on the UK Singles Chart in 1986, which marked the beginning of a downturn in Kershaw's fortunes on the single charts. It also meant that it was the first time that a Kershaw single failed to make the Top 40, since his first single "I Won't Let the Sun Go Down on Me", in 1983.

Writing
The song's lyrics refer to tabloid journalism, the paparazzi, and the public's right to know intimate details of celebrities' lives.

Release
The single was released in the United Kingdom, Germany, Canada, Australia, Portugal, Italy, and France. The B-side for the single "One of Our Fruit Machines Is Missing" was exclusive to the single, written and produced solely by Kershaw. It has only been released on the compilation album The Best of Nik Kershaw (1993) since, which also featured the extended 12" mix of "Nobody Knows".

Track listing
7" single (MCA NIK 10)
A. "Nobody Knows" – 4:18
B. "One of Our Fruit Machines Is Missing (Instrumental)" – 3:38

12" single (MCA NIKT 10)
A. "Nobody Knows" (Extended Mix) – 7:29
B1. "One of Our Fruit Machines Is Missing (Instrumental)"	– 3:38
B2. "Nobody Knows" – 4:18

Personnel
Credits are adapted from the album's liner notes.
Nik Kershaw – lead and background vocals; guitars; keyboards; computers
Andy Richards – keyboards; computers
Paul "Wix" Wickens – keyboards
Mark Brzezicki – drums; drum programming
Mark Price – additional drums
Tim Sanders – tenor saxophone
Simon Clarke – alto saxophone
Roddy Lorimer – trumpet
Steve Sidwell – trumpet 
Peter Thoms – trombone
Iva Davies – backing vocals
Miriam Stockley – backing vocals
Stevie Lange – backing vocals
Gary Dyson – backing vocals

Charts

References

External links
 

1986 singles
1986 songs
Nik Kershaw songs
Songs written by Nik Kershaw
MCA Records singles